Paul Sharp may refer to:

 Paul Sharp (American football) (1952–2012), American college football coach
 Paul F. Sharp (1918–2009), professor and college administrator
 Paul M. Sharp (born 1957), professor of genetics at the University of Edinburgh